Banyu Biru is a 2005 Indonesian film starring Tora Sudiro. It features music by Slank.

References

External links 
 

2005 films
2000s Indonesian-language films
Films shot in Indonesia
Indonesian drama films
2000s drama road movies
2005 drama films